Petit pâté de Pézenas is a speciality of the town of Pézenas in the Hérault département of France.

The size and shape of a large cotton reel, these little pies are a golden brown, crispy pastry with a moist, sweet inside. They can be eaten as an hors d'oeuvre, with a salad or as a dessert. They are cooked in patisseries all over the town, but their origin is far from local. Tradition has it that Lord Clive brought the recipe from India and taught it to the pastry makers of Pézenas when he was staying at the Château de Larzac in 1768. More likely is that his servants were responsible.

The Confrérie du petit pâté de Pézenas was created in 1991 to "promote and defend the Petit pâté de Pézenas". To prevent the recipe going abroad or being stolen, the fraternity has filed it with the Institut national de la propriété industrielle (National Institute of Industrial Property, INPI), giving legal protection.

Recipe
Ingredients:
200g lean roast mutton
100g sheep suet
75g lard
250g flour
5 soup spoons of brown and white sugar
lemon peel
salt and pepper
 
Method:
Mince the mutton, fat, sugar, lemon peel, salt and pepper.
Mix together the lard, flour, a pinch of salt and a little water.
Knead to a smooth dough, roll out and make small cylindrical pots.
Fill with the stuffing.
Leave to rest for 24 hours.
Cook in a hot oven for 35–40 minutes.
Serve warm.

The same filling is also used in Tourte de Pézenas, made with flaky pastry.

In culture
In the BBC TV programme MasterChef: The Professionals, broadcast on 27 November 2012, Michel Roux, Jr. demonstrated how to cook the dish and set it as the "classic recipe" for contestants to make.

References

External links
 Confrérie du Petit Pâté de Pézenas 

French cuisine
Hérault